The Maricopa Live Steamers Railroad Heritage Preservation Society is a live steamer club in Phoenix, Arizona.  Their Adobe Western Railway, a  gauge miniature railway, has  of track.  They also offer free train rides to the public.

See also 
 List of heritage railroads in the United States

7½ in gauge railways in the United States
Organizations based in Phoenix, Arizona
Tourist attractions in Phoenix, Arizona
Rail transportation in Arizona